Olzvoin Ochbayar (born 26 April 1989) is a Mongolian international footballer. He has appeared 4 times for the Mongolia national football team.

References

1989 births
Mongolian footballers
Living people
Association football defenders
Mongolia international footballers